Hamilton may refer to:

People 

 Hamilton (name), a common British surname and occasional given name, usually of Scottish origin, including a list of persons with the surname
 The Duke of Hamilton, the premier peer of Scotland
 Lord Hamilton (disambiguation), several Scottish, Irish and British peers, and some members of the judiciary, who may be referred to simply as Hamilton
 Clan Hamilton, an ancient Scottish kindred
 Alexander Hamilton (1755–1804), first U.S. Secretary of the Treasury and one of the Founding Fathers of the United States
 Lewis Hamilton, a British Formula One driver
William Rowan Hamilton (1805–1865), Irish physicist, astronomer, and mathematician for whom Hamiltonian mechanics is named
Hamílton (footballer) (born 1980), Togolese footballer

Places

Australia 
 Hamilton, New South Wales, suburb of Newcastle
 Hamilton Hill, Western Australia, suburb of Perth
 Hamilton, South Australia
 Hamilton, Tasmania
 Hamilton, Victoria

Queensland
 Hamilton, Queensland, suburb of Brisbane
 Hamilton Reach, a reach of the Brisbane River
 Electoral district of Hamilton (Queensland)
 Town of Hamilton, a former local government area
 Hamilton Town Hall, Brisbane, a heritage-listed former town hall
 Hamilton Island (Queensland)

Canada 
 Hamilton, Ontario
 Hamilton Harbour, formerly known as Burlington Bay, a branch of Lake Ontario
 Hamilton (provincial electoral district), a former electoral riding
 Hamilton (electoral district), a former federal electoral district
 Hamilton, Ontario (township) (unrelated township)
 Hamilton Island (Nunavut)
 Hamilton Island (Ontario)

New Zealand 
 Hamilton, New Zealand
 Hamilton (New Zealand electorate),  a former parliamentary electorate

United Kingdom 
 Hamilton, South Lanarkshire, Scotland (formerly Cadzow, renamed in 15th century)
 Hamilton Mausoleum, which holds the records for the world's longest echo, located in Hamilton, South Lanarkshire
 Hamilton Palace, built 1695, demolished 1927, near Hamilton, South Lanarkshire
 Hamilton (UK Parliament constituency), a former burgh constituency
 Hamilton, Leicestershire, England

United States 

 Hamilton, Alabama
 Hamilton, California, in Butte County
 Hamilton City, California, in Glenn County
 Hamilton, Colorado
 Hamilton, Georgia
 Hamilton, Illinois
 Hamilton, Indiana, in Steuben and DeKalb counties
 Hamilton, Clinton County, Indiana
 Hamilton, Madison County, Indiana
 Hamilton, St. Joseph County, Indiana
 Hamilton, Iowa
 Hamilton, Kansas
 Hamilton, Kentucky
 Hamilton Hills, Baltimore, Maryland, a neighborhood in Baltimore 
 Hamilton, Massachusetts
 Hamilton, Michigan
 Hamilton, Minnesota
 Hamilton, Mississippi
 Hamilton, Missouri
 Hamilton, Montana
 Hamilton, Nevada
 Hamilton Township, Atlantic County, New Jersey
 Hamilton Township, Mercer County, New Jersey
 Hamilton Square, New Jersey, a census-designated place within the township
 Hamilton, Monmouth County, New Jersey
 Hamilton (town), New York
 Hamilton (village), New York
 Hamilton, North Carolina
 Hamilton, North Dakota
 Hamilton, Ohio
 Hamilton, Pennsylvania
 Hamilton, Texas
 Hamilton, Virginia, in Loudoun County
 Hamilton, Cumberland County, Virginia
 Hamilton, Washington
 Hamilton, West Virginia
 Hamilton, Wisconsin
 Hamilton, Fond du Lac County, Wisconsin, an unincorporated community
 Hamilton, Ozaukee County, Wisconsin, an unincorporated community

Other places
 Hamilton, Bermuda, that territory's capital
 Hamilton Parish, Bermuda
 Port Hamilton, a small group of islands in the Jeju Strait off the southern coast of the Korean Peninsula

Arts and entertainment 
 Hamilton (play), a 1917 play by Mary Hamlin
 Hamilton (1998 film), a Swedish-produced film based on the character Carl Hamilton
 Hamilton (2006 film), 2006 American film
 Hamilton: In the Interest of the Nation, 2012 Swedish film
 Hamilton (musical), a 2015 Broadway musical by Lin-Manuel Miranda
Hamilton (album), album based on the musical
 The Hamilton Mixtape, album of music from the musical performed by various artists
Hamilton (2020 film), a live film recording of the musical, featuring the original cast
 Hamilton Records, a record label
 Hamilton (Saturday Night Live)

Businesses 
 Hamish Hamilton Limited, a British book-publishing house
 Hamilton Standard, a supply company for aircraft propeller parts 
 Hamilton Watch Company, a Swiss watchmaker belonging to the Swatch Group
 Hamilton (automobile company), a short-lived automaker in Michigan in the 1910s
 Hamilton's Ewell Vineyards, a South Australian winemaker
 Hamilton Project, a think tank

Educational institutions 
 Hamilton Academy, Scotland (defunct)
 Hamilton and Alexandra College, Victoria, Australia
 Hamilton Boys' High School, New Zealand
 Hamilton College (disambiguation), multiple institutions
 Hamilton Grammar School, Scotland
 Hamilton University, a defunct unaccredited institution based in Evanston, Wyoming, USA

Mathematics and science 
 Hamiltonian mechanics
 Hamilton–Jacobi equation, a set of physical equations in Hamiltonian mechanics
 Hamiltonian (quantum mechanics)
 Hamiltonian path, in mathematical graph theory, a path that visits each vertex in a graph exactly once
 Hamiltonian group, a non-abelian Dedekind group in algebra
 Hamilton Rating Scale for Depression

Other uses 
 Hamilton Academical F.C., Scottish association football club which has youth departments and an affiliated women's team
 Hamilton Field, a former United States Air Force base in California
 Hamilton Rage, also known as K–W United FC, Canadian soccer team (defunct)
 , an American schooner class ship during the War of 1812
 Hamilton railway station (disambiguation), stations of the name
 , a cargo ship with this name from 1947 to 1950
 Hamilton convention, or Cappelletti, a bidding convention in contract bridge
 United States ten-dollar bill, a U.S. currency note, featuring a portrait of Founding Father Alexander Hamilton
 Hamilton Group, a north-eastern US geological structure
 Hamilton (crater), a lunar impact crater

See also 
 Hamilton's
 Hamilton Beach (disambiguation)
 Hamilton Branch (disambiguation)
 Hamilton Creek (disambiguation)
 Hamilton railway station (disambiguation)
 Hamilton Steelhawks (disambiguation)
 Hamilton Township (disambiguation)
 Hamiltonian (disambiguation)
 Justice Hamilton (disambiguation)